The National Center for Construction Education and Research, commonly referred to by the acronym NCCER, is a not-for-profit 501(c)(3) education foundation for professional craft certification, formed in 1996.

Scope
The mission of NCCER is to provide a workforce of safe and productive craft professionals through portable certification and registration that is accepted industry-wide. The assessment for certification falls within two categories, the written assessment and the performance assessment. Passing the written assessment will result in a “Knowledge Verified” certification, passing the performance assessment will result in a “Performance Verified” certificate, and passing both will result in a “Certified” designation.

History
In 1991 eleven companies met to address skilled worker shortages and create a standard curricula with industry recognized credentials. In 1993 the organization released the Master Trainer Instructor Certification Program, Instructor Certification Training Program, accreditation guidelines, and fifty-three organizations applied for accreditation. The first completed module was entered into a "Registry System". On January 1, 1996 the foundation became organized as a 501(c)(3) non-profit.

OSHA
Since 2010 OSHA has been working for rule making requiring national Accredited Crane Operator Certification. A November 9, 2017 deadline was extended for a year over concerns of “certifying by capacity” and if certification would be equivalent to qualification. Certifying by capacity has been an area of concern since 2013. On November 10, 2018, the final rule will take effect without the capacity requirement. OSHA has determined that industry concerns that capacity is not included in crane training, the rated operating capacity (ROC) is not a determining factor of a crane operator’s skill and experience, and the cost affecting approximately 117,130 crane operators would be $1.6 million annually. OSHA estimates a one-time industry savings of $25.5 million. The employer requirement to determine competency, that was taken out in 2014, is reversed and made permanent, requiring every new hire to be evaluated on site as well as having their accredited certification. This is seen as a draw-back to mobile crane operator "portable” certification" since anytime an operator changes jobs he or she will be treated as a new-hire trainee because an employer will have to assess different skills than the existing certification tests including: Inspecting the equipment, assessing unstable loads, hoisting loads of irregular size, operation from a barge, personnel hoisting, rigging the load, leveling the crane, hoisting in tight spaces, making judgments about wind speed and other environmental factors, performing multiple crane lifts, traveling with or without a load, operating near power lines, hoisting light loads, and hoisting blind picks where the operator cannot see the load.

OSHA formally recognized NCCER Crane Operator Certification Program on May 20, 2010. A ceremony was held in Washington, D.C. that included the North American Crane Bureau, the US Assistant Secretary of Labor for OSHA, the Acting Director for OSHA’s Directorate of Construction, the President/CEO, Associated Builders and Contractors, Inc., the President/CEO, Associated General Contractors of America, the Vice President, Government Relations, American National Standards Institute (ANSI), that accredited NCCER under ANSI/ISOIEC 17024, and the President of NCCER.

NTSA participants
The National Training Service Agreement (NTSA) currently has more than 140 contractors and association contributors and contractors can be directly reimbursed for approved training and workforce development expenditures. Participants also support development and industry advancement of craft training provided by NCCER.

References

Organizations established in 1996
501(c)(3) organizations